André Lerond (6 December 1930 – 8 April 2018) was a French footballer who played as a defender. He played mainly as a centre back or at left back, and occasionally as a left half. He was part of the French national teams of the 1950s. According to France Football in 2007, Lerond was "of average size, but extremely quick, a great technician, calm and always at the right place. He was a very gifted footballer." He captained the France national team 14 times. He died on 8 April 2018 at the age of 87.

Honours

 French Player of the Year: 1962
 FIFA World Cup (3rd Place): 1958

References

External links
 
 
 Profile on French federation official site

1930 births
2018 deaths
Association football defenders
Footballers from Le Havre
French footballers
France international footballers
AS Cannes players
Olympique Lyonnais players
Stade Français (association football) players
Ligue 1 players
1958 FIFA World Cup players